Daryl Harr (born May 5, 1982) is a Canadian professional stock car racing driver. The St. Albert, Alberta native has competed in the NASCAR Xfinity Series, K&N Pro Series West, CASCAR and the Pirelli World Challenge.

Racing career

CASCAR
Harr started racing in the CASCAR West Series and CASCAR Super Series in 1998 at age sixteen. He ran the full season a year later while also dabbling in the East Series and the four-race Super Series schedule. Harr again ran the full West season again in 2000, finishing third in points. He also drove the Super Series, finishing seventh in points. After the CASCAR reorganization in 2000, Harr focused mainly on the West Series and ran only a small schedule in the newly expanded Super Series. He recorded his first West win in 2000. In 2001, Harr finished out of the top ten only once and finished third in points. The following year, he won a quarter of the races in the eight-race season and won his first championship. 2003 was Harr's last full-time season, and he won two races en route to a second-place points finish. After focusing mainly on the NASCAR K&N Pro Series West, he came back for a majority of races in 2006 and won the season opening race. After NASCAR purchased CASCAR in 2006 to form the Canadian Tire Series, Harr returned for sporadic races.

K&N Pro Series West
Harr's lone venture into the K&N Pro Series West in 2001 ended in a crash at the Las Vegas Motor Speedway Bullring. Harr expanded his schedule in 2002, his CASCAR championship-winning season. He continued to run part-time while focusing on CASCAR in 2003. In his first full season, Harr finished seventh in the 2004 point standings. He claimed his first top five in the series in 2005.  He scaled back to a partial schedule in 2006 while running mainly in Canada. Returning to the series for the majority of races in 2007, recurring mechanical issues hampered Harr's efforts. Running the full schedule for his family team in 2008, Harr led his first laps in the series. After a disappointing 2009 season and a part-time effort in 2010, he returned for the full 2011 season, finishing eighth in points. He missed two races in 2012 while running seven Nationwide Series starts. Saving the best for last, Harr had arguably his best season in 2013, scoring five top tens. After a couple of races in 2014, Harr left the series.

Nationwide Series
Scaling back his K&N Pro Series West schedule in 2009, Harr attempted five races with Rick Ware Racing. He made his debut at Phoenix International Raceway, the only race he made all season, finishing 37th. Harr attempted three races the following year with his family team but failed to qualify for all three. An early-season partnership with Jimmy Means Racing ensued in 2011, in which Harr finished one of his three starts. JD Motorsports signed Harr to run a partial schedule in 2012, and he ran seven races in the team's flagship No. 4, including the series' lone Canadian race, at Circuit Gilles Villeneuve, where he recorded a best finish of 23rd. Running four more races in 2013 with JD, harr ran both events at Phoenix, his most successful oval track. In late 2013 it was announced that Harr would pilot a second car part-time for JD in 2014. Harr wound up piloting the new No. 87 car for three races. For one of those races, the Boyd Gaming 300 at Las Vegas Motor Speedway, Harr teamed up with former National Football League placekicker Nick Lowery  to help with Lowery's "Champions for Bullying" initiative, thought to be one of the largest programs of its kind. By doing so, Harr became the first NASCAR driver to join a bullying initiative.

Road racing
After leaving stock car racing in 2014, Harr started participating in road racing, a longstanding passion for him. He also wanted to inspire younger Canadians to get into racing. He started racing in the Pirelli World Challenge in 2016.

Personal life
Harr's father Carl also raced in CASCAR, the NASCAR Pinty's Series and NASCAR K&N Pro Series East.

Motorsports career results

NASCAR
(key) (Bold – Pole position awarded by qualifying time. Italics – Pole position earned by points standings or practice time. * – Most laps led.)

Nationwide Series

Canadian Tire Series

ARCA Racing Series
(key) (Bold – Pole position awarded by qualifying time. Italics – Pole position earned by points standings or practice time. * – Most laps led.)

References

External links
 

1982 births
Living people
NASCAR drivers
Racing drivers from Alberta
Sportspeople from St. Albert, Alberta
ARCA Menards Series drivers